Opequon Creek (historically also Opecken)is an approximately 35 mile  tributary stream of the Potomac River. It flows into the Potomac northeast of Martinsburg in Berkeley County, West Virginia, and its source lies northwest of the community of Opequon at the foot of Great North Mountain in Frederick County, Virginia. The Opequon forms part of the boundary between Frederick and Clarke counties in Virginia and also partially forms the boundary between Berkeley and Jefferson counties in West Virginia's Eastern Panhandle.

Opequon is a name derived from an unidentified local Native American language.

Tributaries
Streams are listed from south (headwaters) to the north (mouth).
Stribling Run
Hoge Run
Wrights Run
Buffalo Lick Run
Sulphur Spring Run
Isaac Run
Abrams Creek
Town Run
Ash Hollow Run
Redbud Run
Dry Marsh Run
Lick Run
Littlers Run
Ross Run
Thomas Run
Abrils Run
Duncan Run
Silver Spring Run
Specks Run
Turkey Run
Mill Creek
Torytown Run
Sylvan Run
Three Run
Goose Creek
Middle Creek
Hopewell Run
Dry Run
Buzzard Run
Sulphur Spring Branch
Spa Run
Cold Spring Run
Evens Run
Tuscarora Creek
Eagle Run
Hoke Run

Flora and Fauna 
The Opequon Creek is home to many species of Crayfish and Minnow. Many species of turtles also inhabit the creek, most notably the Eastern box turtle. Snakes are very common, with Copperheads and Garter snakes being the most numerous. Many species of mammals live near the creek's water, the biggest being the White-tailed deer. Plants types that live along the creek include grasses, water lilies, and aquatic plants. Sycamore trees, Tulip Trees, and Willow trees dig their roots along the creeks banks.

Water flow 
Due to water runoff during rainfall, the water flow of the Opequon Creek varies. In the spring, the creek's output of water is very high due to wet conditions during spring. In the summer, the water flow is usually normal, with Thunderstorms raising the water, and short-term droughts lowering the water. In the fall, the water level is usually below-normal due to dry conditions and lower rainfall. During the winter however, the creek is usually at its highest because of low evaporation caused by cold temperatures and thick cloud covers. The creek rarely freezes over, but sometimes stagnant water will freeze through.

Water quality 
The water quality of Opequon Creek is very mixed. While the creek is in the North Mountain, its water quality is general good because of the low pollution and the low population of North Mountain. Its water quality dramatically drops once it joins the spring-fed streams because of agricultural run-off. Due to numerous dams though, this run-off doesn't always make it to the Potomac River. When it joins the Potomac, its water quality is good to moderate.

List of cities and towns along Opequon Creek
Baker Heights
Bartonsville
Bedington
Blairton
Burnt Factory
Leetown
Martinsburg
Middleway
Opequon
Parkins Mills
Tarico Heights
Wadesville
Inwood
Winchester

See also
List of West Virginia rivers
List of Virginia rivers

References

Rivers of Berkeley County, West Virginia
Rivers of Clarke County, Virginia
Rivers of Frederick County, Virginia
Rivers of Jefferson County, West Virginia
Rivers of Virginia
Rivers of West Virginia
Tributaries of the Potomac River